The Beyler Mosque is a historical and architectural monument which is located in the city of Baku, in a historical part of Icherisheher (Old City), opposite the “Murad” Gate of the Shirvanshah Palace Complex. According to the order of the Cabinet of Ministers of Azerbaijan on historical and cultural monuments, the Beyler Mosque has been included to the list of historical and cultural monument of national importance.

History 
The mosque was built in 1895 on the site of an older mosque. The construction of the mosque was implemented by the sons of Mohammed Hashim Al-Bakuvi - Haji Baba and Haji Javad, as well as Murtuza Muhtarov, calligrapher Ibrahim Shirvani, Mir Ali an-Nagi, Mir Tagi, architect Seyid Huseyn.

During the construction of the mosque, while maintaining the local features of the architecture, new architectural style was founded. For the first time, an attempt was made to apply the techniques inherent in the architectural school of the Shirvanshahs.

Between 2014 and 2015 the mosque was restored by Austrian renowned restorer expert Erich Pummer who was involved by the Administration of State Historical-Architectural Reserve “Icherisheher”. After restoration the Administration of State Historical-Architectural Reserve “Icherisheher” decided to use the mosque as a museum too. In the mosque 73 Kuran books of various periods, 7 ancient religious books, as well as 19 religious attributes and other 99 exhibits are demonstrated. The exhibition also demonstrates The Quran belonging to ancient Derbent Mosque.

Structure 
The architecture of the mosque combines western, eastern and local architectural traditions. It has a lobby, a prayer hall, and a decorated mihrab. The prayer hall is three-naved, which is characteristic for the mosques of Azerbaijan, which were built since the second half of the 19th century, and is found not only at the mosques of Baku and Absheron, but also of Shirvan, Karabakh, Guba, Sheki and Zagatala. Similar structures have Turkic peoples in the era of feudalism. Around the mosque a park is located with interesting design.

Gallery

See also 
 List of mosques in Azerbaijan
 Bibi-Heybat Mosque
 Juma Mosque (Baku)

References 

Mosques in Baku
19th-century mosques
Icherisheher